William Findlay Rogers (March 1, 1820 – December 16, 1899) was an American politician who served one term as a member of the U.S. House of Representatives from New York from 1883 to 1885.

Rogers is probably best remembered today as the mayor and parks commissioner who hired Frederick Law Olmsted to design Buffalo's park system and its showpiece, Delaware Park. Rogers also supported the foundation of the Buffalo Zoo.

Early life
William Findlay Rogers was born in Forks Township, Pennsylvania, near the borough of Easton, Pennsylvania, on March 1, 1820. He was the son of Irish-born U.S. Representative Thomas Jones Rogers and Mary (née Winters) Rogers, daughter of Christian Winters.

He moved with his parents to Philadelphia, where he attended the common schools.  Rogers returned to Easton and entered a printing office in 1832.  Two years later, he returned to Philadelphia, Pennsylvania and continued working at his trade.

Career
In 1840, Rogers established a paper at Honesdale, Pennsylvania.  In 1846, he moved to Buffalo, New York and became a foreman in the office of the Buffalo Daily Courier.  Rogers established and managed the Buffalo Republic in 1850.

Rogers served as a member of Company D of the Buffalo City Guard, in 1846, and served in the American Civil War as colonel of the 21st New York Volunteer Infantry.  He mustered out in 1863.

Political career
In 1867, he became the comptroller of the city of Buffalo and its mayor in 1869.  He served as secretary and treasurer of the Buffalo park commissioners in 1871.  He was nominated for the New York State Senate in 1878, but declined.

Congress 
Rogers was elected as a Democrat to the Forty-eighth Congress.  He was not a candidate for renomination in 1884.  He served as the superintendent of the Soldiers' and Sailors' Home at Bath, New York, from 1887 to 1897.

Personal life
Rogers was twice married and the father of four children. He was first married to Caroline M. Waldron (1821–1847), and they were the parents of one son:

 Franklin Rogers, who became a printer.

After her death, he married Phoebe Demony (1830–1890) in 1849. They were the parents of:

 Mary Rogers, who married William C. Brown.
 Florence R. Rogers (1861–1932), who married Charles N. Armstrong (1858–1927).
 Thomas J. Rogers, a prominent civil engineer.

He died in Buffalo on December 16, 1899, and is interred in Forest Lawn Cemetery.

References

Sources
 

William Findlay Rogers at The Political Graveyard

External links

 

1820 births
1899 deaths
American newspaper founders
American people of Irish descent
Mayors of Buffalo, New York
Burials at Forest Lawn Cemetery (Buffalo)
Democratic Party members of the United States House of Representatives from New York (state)
19th-century American journalists
American male journalists
People from Honesdale, Pennsylvania
Union Army colonels
19th-century American male writers
19th-century American politicians
Politicians from Northampton County, Pennsylvania
Mayors of places in New York (state)
19th-century American businesspeople
Military personnel from Pennsylvania